Alen Marcina (born July 30, 1979) is a Canadian soccer coach and former player who is currently the head coach of USL Championship side San Antonio FC. He is a three-time champion with San Antonio Scorpions and Rayo OKC in the NASL.

Club career 

Marcina played college soccer with Barry University, and with New Westminster Khalsa in the Pacific Coast Soccer League, before joining the Ottawa Wizards for the 2002–03 CPSL season, where he scored 9 goals in just 10 matches. When the Wizards had their license revoked by the CPSL, Marcina tried his luck in Europe and managed to land a contract with Greek giants and UEFA Cup Participants PAOK Thessaloniki in January 2004. The next years saw him play with ÍA Akranes of Iceland, Schweinfurt of Germany and Herfølge Boldklub of Denmark.

Marcina signed with the Puerto Rico Islanders for the 2006 season of the second-tier league of American soccer, the USL First Division, which is a level below Major League Soccer.  He scored 13 goals in 27 appearances for the Islanders earning All-League selection before moving to the New Zealand Knights in November 2006. He netted his first goal for the Knights against the Newcastle Jets and also scored in the 3–1 win over the Queensland Roar.

Marcina returned to the USL and Puerto Rico in 2007, making another handful of appearances, before being bought by Canadian club Montreal Impact in June 2007. He was traded in July 2007 to the Vancouver Whitecaps. He signed with the Minnesota Thunder on February 12, 2008.  On August 27, 2008, the Thunder sold Marcina's contract to the Rochester Rhinos. In April 2009 left Rochester Rhinos and signed with Miami FC where he led the team in goals, games played and minutes played. Marcina announced his retirement in 2010 after turning down multiple offers in the US and Vietnam.

International career

Marcina called up by the Canadian national team missed New Zealand's round 21 match against Perth Glory at North Harbour Stadium.

Managerial career 

 2012 NASL Champion-North American Supporters' Trophy (most goals scored (46) and fewest goals conceded (27)
 2013 NASL Spring season third place (1 point out of first place)
 2014 NASL Fall Champion
 2014 NASL Soccer Bowl Champion. (fewest goals conceded (24) and second-most goals scored (43))
 2015 NASL Spring seventh place (SA scorpions folded November 2015)
 2016 NASL Fall season second place (one point out of first place)
 2016 NASL Top 5 overall standings (resigned August 1, 2016)
 2022 USL Championship Champion

Personal life 
Marcina family is of Croatian ancestry, originally hails from Dugi Otok in Croatia.

References

External links 

 Miami FC bio
  Rochester Rhinos bio
 https://web.archive.org/web/20120514051340/http://www.sanantonioscorpions.com/club/the-team/coaching-staff

1979 births
Living people
Association football forwards
Canadian soccer players
Soccer people from British Columbia
Sportspeople from Surrey, British Columbia
Canadian people of Croatian descent
Canadian expatriate soccer players
Expatriate soccer players in the United States
Canadian expatriate sportspeople in the United States
Expatriate footballers in Greece
Canadian expatriate sportspeople in Greece
Expatriate footballers in Iceland
Canadian expatriate sportspeople in Iceland
Expatriate footballers in Germany
Canadian expatriate sportspeople in Germany
Expatriate men's footballers in Denmark
Canadian expatriate sportspeople in Denmark
Expatriate footballers in Puerto Rico
Canadian expatriate sportspeople in Puerto Rico
Expatriate association footballers in New Zealand
Canadian expatriate sportspeople in New Zealand
Barry University alumni
Herfølge Boldklub players
Miami FC (2006) players
Minnesota Thunder players
Montreal Impact (1992–2011) players
New Zealand Knights FC players
Ottawa Wizards players
Puerto Rico Islanders players
Rochester New York FC players
Vancouver Whitecaps (1986–2010) players
Canadian Soccer League (1998–present) players
A-League Men players
USL First Division players
Canadian soccer coaches
North American Soccer League coaches